The 2022 FINA World Junior Diving Championships took place in Montréal, Canada, from 27 November to 04 December 2022.

Medal summary

Men's events

Women's events

Synchronized diving

High diving

Medal table

Participating nations
Divers from 36 countries participated at the championships.

References

External links 

FINA World Junior Diving Championships
FINA World Junior Diving Championships
International sports competitions hosted by Canada
Sports competitions in Montreal
FINA
FINA